Felipe Saraiva de Souza Silva (born 9 March 1998), known as Felipe Saraiva, is a Brazilian footballer who plays for Inter de Limeira, on loan from Maringá. Mainly a forward, he can also play as an attacking midfielder.

Club career

Ponte Preta
Saraiva was born in Santa Isabel, São Paulo, and joined Ponte Preta's youth setup in 2014. On 12 February 2016, after impressing with their under-17 side, he was loaned to São Paulo for the season. Initially assigned to their under-20 squad, he also featured in the year's Copa Paulista.

Upon returning to Ponte in January 2017, Saraiva was assigned to the main squad and made his first team – and Série A – debut on 25 June 2017, coming on as a second-half substitute for Elton in a 1–2 home loss against Palmeiras. He scored his first senior goal on 13 September, netting his team's only in a 1–3 away loss against Sport Recife, for the year's Copa Sudamericana.

After being regularly used in the 2017 Série A (where his club suffered relegation) and in the 2018 Campeonato Paulista, Saraiva lost his starting spot. On 29 January 2019, he was loaned to Botafogo-SP for the 2019 campaign.

Back at Ponte for the 2020 season, Saraiva featured sparingly before leaving the club in June 2020, after failing to agree new terms.

Maringá
On 26 September 2020, free agent Saraiva was announced at Maringá for the second division of the Campeonato Paranaense. He helped the side in their promotion to the top tier of the state league after scoring twice in six matches.

On 23 January 2021, Saraiva was presented at Inter de Limeira, after joining the club on loan for the 2021 Campeonato Paulista.

Career statistics

References

External links
 

1998 births
Living people
Footballers from São Paulo (state)
Brazilian footballers
Association football forwards
Campeonato Brasileiro Série A players
Campeonato Brasileiro Série B players
Associação Atlética Ponte Preta players
Botafogo Futebol Clube (SP) players
Maringá Futebol Clube players
Associação Atlética Internacional (Limeira) players
People from Santa Isabel, São Paulo